Frank Dinning Clayton (10 January 1866 – 29 September 1944) was a New Zealand sportsman. He played six first-class matches for Otago between 1892 and 1897.

Clayton was born at Auckland in 1866 and educated at Auckland Grammar School, later working as a bank clerk. As well as cricket he played rugby union for Auckland and was selected for the national team to tour New South Wales in 1884, but withdrew from the tour party before it began. He died at Wellington in 1944.

References

External links
 

1866 births
1944 deaths
New Zealand cricketers
Otago cricketers
Cricketers from Auckland